Arandu may refer to:

Arandu, São Paulo, a municipality in the state of São Paulo, Brazil
Arandu, Khyber Pakhtunkhwa, a town in Chitral District, Khyber Pakhtunkhwa, Pakistan
Arandu, Gilgit-Baltistan, a town in Skardu District, Gilgit-Baltistan, Pakistan